Bombardment of Algiers may refer to:
 1st Bombardment of Algiers (1682) by a French squadron
 2nd Bombardment of Algiers (1683) by a French squadron
 3rd Bombardment of Algiers (1688) by a French squadron
 Bombardment of Algiers (1770) by a Danish-Norwegian squadron
 Bombardment of Algiers (1783) by a Spanish fleet
 Bombardment of Algiers (1784) by an allied Spanish, Maltese, Neapolitan, and Portuguese fleet
 Bombardment of Algiers (1816) by an Anglo-Dutch fleet
 Bombardment of Algiers (painting), a painting by Thomas Luny, depicting the 1816 Bombardment